Midwestern Intermediate Unit IV is an Intermediate Unit educational services agency based in Grove City, Pennsylvania. It serves Butler, Lawrence, and Mercer counties.  It has a staff of more than 700 people and serves 27 school districts.

External links
 website 

Intermediate Units in Pennsylvania
Education in Butler County, Pennsylvania
Education in Lawrence County, Pennsylvania
Education in Mercer County, Pennsylvania